Chicken paprikash ( or csirkepaprikás) or paprika chicken is a popular dish of Hungarian origin and one of the most famous variations on the paprikás preparations common to Hungarian tables. The name is derived from the ample use of paprika,  a spice commonly used in Hungarian cuisine. The meat is typically simmered for an extended period in a sauce that begins with a paprika-infused roux.

Preparation
The édes nemes (sweet paprika) is the preferred kind of paprika; it adds a rosy color as well as flavor. Sometimes olive oil and sweet red or yellow peppers, and a small amount of tomato paste are used. The dish bears a "family resemblance" to goulash, another paprika dish.

The dish is traditionally served with "dumpling-like boiled egg noodles" (nokedli), a broad noodle similar to the German spätzle. Other side dishes that it may be served with include tagliatelle (boiled ribbon noodles), rice, or millet.

Variations
Food columnist Iles Brody's recipe called for chicken, onions, butter or lard, sweet paprika, green peppers, tomatoes, clove garlic, flour, and sour cream. Other recipes are similar. While quartered chicken parts are more traditional, modern interpretations of the recipe may call for boneless, skinless chicken thighs.

A version of paprikash (паприкаш) exists in  Bulgarian cuisine; however, it includes smaller amounts of paprika being added to the sautéed onion at the beginning of the cooking and then adding cubed, usually green, sweet peppers. The dish is centered on the latter.

Chicken paprikash was adopted as a Sabbath dish by the Jews of Hungary and Czechoslovakia and remains popular today amongst Ashkenazim. Tomatoes are often included, and in Romania the dish was traditionally served with mămăligă. When cooked by Jews, chicken paprikash typically does not include any dairy products, due to the Jewish prohibition against mixing meat and dairy.

See also

 List of chicken dishes

References

External links 

Hungarian cuisine
Chicken dishes

sr:Паприкаш